This is a list of the five most populous incorporated cities and Capital in all 50 U.S. states, the District of Columbia, and the 5 inhabited territories of the United States.

List

Census-designated places on the list

Note 1:  The only incorporated place in Hawaii is the City & County of Honolulu. A portion of it, the Honolulu District, is sometimes regarded as the "city" for statistical purposes, although it has no government separate from that of the City and County as a whole. The U.S. Census Bureau defines Honolulu CDP (census-designated place) to coincide with the Honolulu District. Thus for Hawaii, the largest CDPs are ranked.

Note 2: The 4 municipalities of the Northern Mariana Islands are listed. Each municipality is divided into smaller villages, but the municipalities are considered the primary subdivisions (as in how Saipan is usually listed as the capital rather than Capitol Hill, Saipan). The five largest villages are Garapan (3,983), Dandan (3,280), Koblerville (2,493), Finasisu (2,491) and Kagman III (2,402), with Capitol Hill being the 19th largest village at 1,028 people.

Note 3: The most populous sub-districts of the U.S. Virgin Islands (as defined by the U.S. Census Bureau) are listed. The three largest towns are Charlotte Amalie (10,354), Christiansted (2,433) and Frederiksted (859).

Note 4: Though Maryland has a number of incorporated places, many major population centers, usually suburbs in the Baltimore-Washington corridor, are census-designated places. For a list of incorporated places, see List of incorporated places in Maryland. If only incorporated places are considered, Annapolis, Maryland's capital, is the seventh-largest city of the state.

See also

United States of America
Outline of the United States
Index of United States-related articles

United States Census Bureau
Demographics of the United States
Urbanization in the United States
List of US states and territories by population
List of US cities by population
Lists of US cities and metropolitan areas
List of largest cities of U.S. states and territories by historical population
 Office of Management and Budget
 Statistical area (United States)
Combined statistical area (list)
Core-based statistical area (list)
Metropolitan statistical area (list, by GDP)
Micropolitan statistical area (list)
Largest cities in the United States by population by decade
List of cities proper by population (most populous cities in the world)
List of lists of settlements in the United States
List of United States cities by population density
List of United States urban areas

Notes

References 

 
Cities by population
United States, largest cities